Charles Sumner Murkland (May 30, 1856 – November 11, 1926) was the first elected President of the New Hampshire College of Agriculture and the Mechanic Arts following the college's move from Hanover to Durham in the United States. While a scholar and executive, his lack of an agricultural background made him a surprising choice for the position.  While President, Murkland proposed adding preparatory classes and a two-year degree and during his first year Graduate study was also established .

Biography
On May 30, 1856, Murkland was born in Lowell, Massachusetts. He attended Middlebury College and graduated in 1881, as valedictorian of his class.  He then attended Harvard Divinity School, receiving a Bachelor of Divinity. In 1884, Murkland completed his Master of Arts from Middlebury and also completed one year of post-graduate study at Andover Theological Seminary. After completing school, Murkland served as a pastor in Chicopee, Massachusetts and Manchester.

On May 18, 1893, the New Hampshire College of Agriculture and the Mechanic Arts Board of Trustees elected Murkland as president of the college.  His term began on July 3, 1893, and was inaugurated August 30, 1893, becoming the first elected and second president of the college.  While President, Murkland received a Doctor of Divinity from Middlebury in 1900, and a PhD from Dartmouth College in 1903.

President of New Hampshire College
Murkland served as President of the college from 1893 to 1903.  He advocated adding preparatory courses and a two-year degree to the college. It is said that Murkland's strong liberal arts and theological background contributed to his conflict with those who believed that the college should emphasize only agricultural sciences. Murkland argued for a broad interpretation of the Morrill Act, which would require the college try to meet the needs of all groups within the state. The Board of Trustees took issue with Murkland's statement concerning the possible addition of classical languages to the curriculum.

Murkland greatly contributed to the growth and expansion of the college. During his administration, the student body, faculty and staff doubled in size. Morrill Hall, an agricultural building, was constructed during Murkland's presidency.  After accomplishing most of what he set out to do and also feeling the duties of his position conflicted with his teaching duties, Murkland presented his resignation to the Board of Trustees effective May 1, 1903.

Murkland Hall at the University of New Hampshire is the center of the university's College of Liberal Arts and is named for Charles Murkland.

References

External links
University of New Hampshire
University of New Hampshire: Office of the President
"Guide to the Charles Sumner Murkland Papers 1893-1903", University of New Hampshire Library
Full list of University Presidents (including interim Presidents) , University of New Hampshire Library

1856 births
1926 deaths
Presidents of the University of New Hampshire
People from Lowell, Massachusetts
Harvard Divinity School alumni
Middlebury College alumni
Dartmouth College alumni